Heliolonche carolus is a species of moth of the family Noctuidae. It is found in North America, including California and Arizona.

External links

Images

Heliothinae